The Spivey Building is a 12-story skyscraper located at 417 Missouri Avenue in East St. Louis, Illinois. Built in 1927, the building is the only skyscraper ever constructed in East St. Louis. Architect Albert B. Frankel designed the building in the Commercial style. The building's design features terra cotta spandrels separating its windows vertically and brick pier dividing its window bays. The asymmetrical entrance is surrounded by decorative marble piers, and the first two stories are separated from the rest of the building by a cornice and sill. The top of the building features a two-story parapet with terra cotta surrounds at each window and seven capitals at its peak. During the height of East St. Louis' prosperity through the 1950s, the building housed the offices of professionals in many fields who were considered among the best in the city. However, the building became a victim of the city's steep economic decline and has been abandoned for several decades.

The building was added to the National Register of Historic Places on January 17, 2002.

References

Commercial buildings on the National Register of Historic Places in Illinois
Commercial architecture in Illinois
Commercial buildings completed in 1927
Buildings and structures in St. Clair County, Illinois
East St. Louis, Illinois
Skyscrapers in Illinois
National Register of Historic Places in St. Clair County, Illinois
Skyscraper office buildings in Illinois
Unused buildings in Illinois
Chicago school architecture in Illinois
1927 establishments in Illinois